Spirit of Korean Celadon is a 2002 North Korean film directed by Phyo Kwang. A drama with "fun, unconventional musical sequences", the film is set during the Goryeo period and tells the story of a craftsman devoted to making traditional Korean celadon.

Spirit of Korean Celadon was one of three North Korean films shown at the Special Screening section of the Jeonju International Film Festival, held from 28 April–6 May 2005.

References

External links

2000s Korean-language films
North Korean drama films
2002 films
Films set in the Goryeo Dynasty